Paratryphera is a genus of flies in the family Tachinidae.

Species
P. barbatula (Rondani, 1859)
P. bisetosa (Brauer & von Bergenstamm, 1891)
P. mesnili Herting, 1977
P. palpalis (Rondani, 1859)
P. yichengensis Chao & Liu, 1998

References

Diptera of Europe
Diptera of North America
Exoristinae
Tachinidae genera
Taxa named by Julius von Bergenstamm
Taxa named by Friedrich Moritz Brauer